A Celebration in Song is the twenty-third and final solo studio album by British-Australian pop singer Olivia Newton-John, released on 3 June 2008 by Warner Bros. in Australia. The worldwide release of the album was by EMI, on 2 September 2008. It is her second duets album, following (2), released in 2002 by Festival Mushroom.

On 25 January 2011, the album was re-released by Spring Hill with a new cover.

Background
The album was released in conjunction with Newton-John's walk to Beijing which, together with this album, raised funds for the future The Olivia Newton-John Cancer and Wellness Center in Melbourne, Australia.

The songs "Never Far Away" (with Richard Marx) and "Sunburned Country" (with Keith Urban) originally belong to Newton-John's 2002 duets album, (2). The song "Beautiful Thing" was taken from Belinda Emmett's album So I Am and the track is "dedicated with love" to her.

Track listing

Notes
 denotes a co-producer
 denotes an arranger

Personnel
Performers and musicians

 Olivia Newton-John – vocals 
 Andy Downer – keyboards (1)
 Amy Sky – keyboards (1, 6, 11), acoustic piano (11), vocals (11)
 Greg Johnston – programming (1, 2, 10), guitars (1, 2, 10), bass guitar (1, 2, 10)
 Tony Harrell – Hammond B3 organ (3)
 Doug Emery – keyboards (4)
 Hal Roland – keyboards (4)
 Dane Bryant – keyboards (5)
 Gary Prim – keyboards (5)
 Anthony Vanderburgh – keyboards (5)
 Attila Fias – keyboards (6) 
 Richard Marx – keyboards (7), programming (7), vocals (7)
 Steve Nathan – organ (8)
 John Farrar – keyboards (9), guitars (9), vocals (9)
 Peter Wolf – additional programming (9)
 Gordon Kennedy – electric guitar (3)
 Mark Punch – acoustic guitar (3)
 Steve Gibb – guitars (4)
 Michael Severs – electric guitar (5)
 Fred Knobloch – acoustic guitar (5)
 Bruce Bouton – pedal steel guitar (5)
 Bill Bell – guitars (6), bass guitar (6)
 Keith Urban – guitars (8), vocals (8)
 Mike Bukovik – guitars (8)
 Jimmie Lee Sloas – bass guitar (3, 5)
 Alison Prestwood – bass guitar (8)
 Mark Kelso – drums (1, 6)
 Dave Sanders – drums (1)
 Steve Brewster – drums (3)
 Lee Levin – drums (4)
 Paul Leim – drums (5)
 Chris McHugh – drums (8)
 Ian Cooper – strings (3)
 Jonathan Yudkin – fiddle (5), cello (5)
 Amy Laing – cello (11)
 Delta Goodrem – vocals (1)
 Cliff Richard – vocals (2)
 RyanDan – harmony vocals (2), vocals (11)
 Melinda Schneider – vocals (3)
 Barry Gibb – vocals (4)
 Jimmy Barnes – vocals (5)
 Sun Ho – vocals (6)
 Martin Landin Chapman – backing vocals (8)
 Steve Real – backing vocals (8)
 Jann Arden – vocals (10)
 Belinda Emmett – vocals (12)

Technical

 Amy Sky – executive producer
 Greg Johnston – recording (1, 2, 10)
 Victor Florencia – mixing (1, 2, 5, 6, 7, 10), recording (4)
 Sam Hannan – recording (1, 6)
 Mark Kelso – recording (1, 6)
 James Freeman – additional recording (3, 11), overdubbing (5), mixing (5)
 Ethan Carlson – recording assistant (2), recording (4), mixing (4)
 Steve Marcantonio – recording (5)
 Bill Bell – recording (6)
 Serge Tsai – recording (6, 10)
 Justin Niebank – engineer (8)
 Elvis Aponte – recording assistant (6, 10)
 Alonzo Vargas – recording assistant (6, 10)
 Todd Gunnerson – assistant engineer (8)
 Noah Passovay – vocal engineer (9)
 Andy Hunt – recording (10)
 John Bailey – recording (11), mixing (11)
 Chuck Turner – mixing (6)
 Cory Barnes – Pro Tools editing (1, 2, 6, 11)
 Joao Carvalho – mastering 
 Kelly David Smith – design
 Michael Caprio – cover design
 Juli Balla – cover photography 
 David Anderson – photography
 Chad Allen Smith – reissue design, reissue photography

Concert

The Olivia Newton-John and Friends: Gala Fundraising Concert was a one-night only concert based in the album. The concert was held at the State Theatre in Sydney on 30 September 2008 to raise funds for the Olivia Newton-John Cancer and Wellness Centre Appeal.

Songs performed
"I Say a Little Prayer" (Paulini)
"Calling You" (Katy Cebrano)
"A Song for You" (Katy Cebrano)
"All Come Together" (Johnny Diesel)
"My Heart Will Go On" (Trisha Crowe)
"Someone to Watch Over Me" (Lucy Durack)
"Sunshine on a Rainy Day" (Christine Anu)
"My Island Home" (Christine Anu)
"Blow Up the Pokies" (Tim Freedman)
"Run to Paradise" (Mark Gable)
"Reminiscing" (Carl Riseley)
"Memphis medley" (Guy Sebastian)
"Tucker's Daughter" (Ian Moss)
"Perfect" (Vanessa Amorosi)
"The Horses" (Daryl Braithwaite)
"Reckless" (James Reyne)
"Hopelessly Devoted to You" (Chantelle Delaney)
"Let Me Be There" (with Chantelle Delaney)
"Tenterfield Saddler" (with Todd McKenney)
"Summer Nights" (with Guy Sebastian)
"Pearls on a Chain"
"Courageous" (with Melinda Schneider)
"I Honestly Love You"
"You're the One That I Want" (Mark Gable and Melinda Schneider)

References

2008 albums
Olivia Newton-John albums
Vocal duet albums
Christmas albums by Australian artists